Creekside Middle School may refer to:
 Creekside Middle School (Carmel, Indiana)
 Creekside Middle School (Castro Valley, California)
 Creekside Middle School (Rohnert Park, California)
 Creekside Middle School (Woodstock, Illinois)
 Creekside Middle School in Port Orange, Florida, part of Volusia_County_Schools